

A war trophy is an item taken during warfare by an invading force. Common war trophies include flags, weapons, vehicles, and art.

History 
In ancient Greece and ancient Rome, military victories were commemorated with a display of captured arms and standards. A trophy (from the Greek tropaion) was originally a war memorial assembled from such items on a battlefield. The Roman triumph also displayed these items as well as cultural objects, which later came to be called war trophies. Body parts of slain enemies have sometimes served as trophies since antiquity, in a practice called human trophy collecting. The recovery of Roman eagles taken as trophies by enemy forces sometimes inspired years of added warfare. 

In more recent times, it has been common for soldiers to return home with souvenirs, such as enemy weapons and flags, while larger military items captured in battle, particularly weaponry such as machine guns and artillery pieces, became the property of the state to which the soldiers responsible for the capture belonged.

In the 20th century, the victorious alliance states removed large quantities of property, including cultural objects. After the First World War, the Treaty of Versailles authorized the removal of large amounts of property from Germany, which it termed "reparations". During the Pacific War, some American troops took the skulls and teeth of dead Japanese as war trophies, and during the occupation, as many as three million guntōs and swords were taken as trophies by the Americans.

After the Second World War, the Potsdam Conference authorized the removal of certain property from Germany, such as the merchant marine fleet. Germany, during the war, had removed large quantities of property from the countries that it had occupied. In some cases, for example the Soviet "trophy brigades", official looting was euphemised as the taking of "trophies".

In the present day, the taking of war trophies continues, but weapons that are taken home as souvenirs are often deactivated first. According to Julian Thompson, only a small number of soldiers will take home war trophies, to avoid trouble – in a highly publicized case in 2012, British soldier Danny Nightingale was subject to a court-martial for illegally bringing a Glock with him after his tour in Iraq.

Cultural objects 

Article 56 of the Hague Convention of 1907, stated:

However, the article was not much respected during the remainder of the century.

In 1954, a further convention was signed at the Hague: Convention for the Protection of Cultural Property in the Event of Armed Conflict, and two protocols have strengthened its force.

Many works of art moved from their pre-war locations during the turmoils of the 20th century. UNESCO, the United Nations agency responsible for culture has been seeking to resolve issues relating to cultural objects displaced in connection with the Second World War. However, the conference in Spring 2007 failed to reach a consensus on a draft non-binding declaration.

See also 

 War loot
 Prize of war
 Prize (law)
 Trophy of arms
 Trophy (architectural)
 Helmet and spurs of Saint Olaf

References 

 
Trophies
Aftermath of war
Looting
Law of war
Victory monuments
Weapons